The 81st (Amphibious) Division of the Nigerian Army is a division active since 2002. It has an area of responsibility covering Lagos and Ogun States of Nigeria.

History 
It is numbered in honor of the 81st (West Africa) Division. The Division which replaced the Lagos Garrison Command (LGC) came into being in 2000. The youngest Division in the Nigerian Army, it was formed on 26 May 2002.

Structure 
The division previously included:

 81st Division Garrison (Lagos)
 9th Brigade (Ikeja)
 165th Mechanised Battalion
 19th Mechanised Battalion
 242th Recce Battalion
 35 Artillery Brigade (Alamala Barracks)

Commanders 

 Major General Umar Thama Musa (15 February 2022-29 July 2022)

 Major General Obinna Ajunwa (since 29 July 2022)

References 

Military units and formations of Nigeria